46th Division or 46th Infantry Division may refer to:

 46th Infantry Division (Wehrmacht), a unit of the German Army 
 46th Reserve Division (German Empire), a unit of the Imperial German Army 
 46th Landwehr Division (German Empire), a unit of the Royal Saxon Army
 46th Rifle Division (Soviet Union)
 46th (North Midland) Division, a unit of the United Kingdom Army 
 46th Infantry Division (United States), a unit of the United States Army 
 46th Division (Imperial Japanese Army), a unit of the Imperial Japanese Army

See also 
 46th Brigade (disambiguation)
 46th Regiment (disambiguation)
 46th Squadron (disambiguation)